The Riviera Theatre is a historic, 1140 seat entertainment venue in North Tonawanda, New York. The theatre hosts a multitude of performing arts events per year, including live concerts, theatre, dance shows, and movies. The Riviera's “Mighty Wurlitzer” theatre organ has been fully restored, is continually maintained by volunteers, and is famed as being one of two original Wurlitzer demonstrator organs, which the company would use to show off to potential clients in the height of the silent film era.

The Riviera Theatre is listed on the National and New York State Register of Historic Places.

History
A local landmark and movie house, the theatre was constructed in 1926 to much fanfare, and was originally named "The New Rivera."  The first films shown were Upstage starring Norma Shearer and The Mona Lisa.  The Wurlitzer Theatre organ installed in the theatre: Opus 1524 was shipped from the nearby (4 mi) Wurlitzer Organ Factory on November 19, 1926. Listed as a Model 235 Special, the organ differed from a standard 3 manual 11 rank Model 235, by substituting an Oboe Horn rank of pipes from the standard Salicional pipes usually found on this model. Other differences included the omission of the standard remote Piano, and a 5 H.P. blower instead of the 7-1/2 H.P. The console was painted and decorated to harmonize with the theatre's interior, by Wurlitzer's Band Organ Artist. The theatre was also a popular vaudeville venue.  During the Depression, the theatre was purchased by the Shea's Theater company. At the end of the silent movie era in the 1930s, the Wurlitzer Theatre organ went into disuse and disrepair and was not heard again until 1944, when it was refurbished.  The Riviera was sold to Dipson Theatres and then to MDA Associates. The theatre changed hands many more times since then.

In the early 1970s, The Niagara Frontier Theater Organ Society (NFTOS) made an offer to purchase the Wurlitzer organ for a substantial amount, along with the provision the instrument must remain in the theatre. This offer was eventually accepted, the NFTOS owned the organ and assured its future. The club enhanced the theatre itself with the purchase of a huge crystal chandelier that formerly graced the Genesee Theatre in Buffalo. Installed in the Riviera's main dome in January 1974, the chandelier measured 10 feet in diameter, 14 feet high, contained 15,000 French crystals and had 3 circuits of 35 bulbs each. A smaller chandelier that came from the Park Lane Restaurant of Buffalo was installed in the Riviera's outer lobby at the same time. Also, added to the stage equipment was a scenic backdrop donated from a Bradford (PA) Theatre. A historic grand piano was also acquired from the same theatre at the same time. The building was added to the National Register of Historic Places in April 1980.  Changing economics threatened to shutter or destroy the theatre on numerous occasions, but it is now a great source of community pride for residents of the Tonawandas.

Rumor has it that at one point in the 1980s Buffalo-born singer Rick James tried to purchase the theatre for a recording studio. In 1988, the theatre was purchased by the NFTOS, now named the Riviera Theatre and Organ Preservation Society, Inc. (RTOPS), a 501(c)3 non-profit volunteer organization. The theatre was painstakingly restored by volunteers donating thousands of hours of labor and has been continuously operated by RTOPS since then under the direction of different managers.

The Riviera is most notable for its Mighty Wurlitzer Theatre organ, which was produced in North Tonawanda, once the home of the Rudolph Wurlitzer Company. In 2008, the organ was re-voiced and restored to nearly original condition, providing a new symphonic sound for concerts and events. The Riviera's Mighty Wurlitzer has provided more entertainment consistently in its original setting than most other Theatre organs, nationwide. Many top name artists, in this country, have performed here in hundreds of concerts over the past 35 years. The Riviera's organ is acclaimed internationally by artist appearances from Europe, Australia, Britain and South America. Several popular organists played their ‘first’ public concert at the Riviera Theatre. The organ has been televised on several occasions, and several commercial recordings have been made on it.

Present & Future 
In 2014, the theatre's marquee was fully restored and modernized by Flexlume Sign Corp., and Wagner Signs. This included restoring the original paint colors, neon, and flashing lights. In place of the plexiglass letter board, two LED video screens now display upcoming events, the content of which was specifically created by the Riviera's design specialist, to imitate the grid and original metal lettering on the board.

In 2015, like most movie theaters, the Riviera was forced to upgrade to a Digital Cinema system in order to continue to play films, as 35mm films were phased out. This was made possible by grants and generous community donations. The theatre's new digital cinema system boasts optimum cinema picture quality and will continue to carry the Riviera's rich movie history for years to come.

Plans are now underway for a capital campaign (Set The Stage), and 23,000sq.ft. expansion of the theatre to include new production and patron spaces, new larger bathroom facilities, an elevator to the balcony level, as well as expanded lobby, bar, and concession facilities.  The $6.1M expansion will also include a meeting space, rehearsal and black box theatre performance space to incubate arts groups from around the area.

Mission

The Riviera Theatre and Organ Preservation Society, Inc. is dedicated to restoring, maintaining, and utilizing the historic 1926 Riviera Theatre and its Mighty WurliTzer theatre organ, as a working historic theatre by offering a wide array of live musical performances, performing arts, and educational opportunities.

The Riviera Theatre will be established as the premiere regional destination for live music, performing arts, while being preserved as a historic landmark with the most well-maintained, and regularly performing, WurliTzer organ in the nation. To that end, the community of the RTOPS, Inc. recognizes the importance of necessary expansion to increase the amenities that modern audiences desire and deserve.

Leadership and Staff 
The Riviera Theatre is owned and operated by the Riviera Theatre & Organ Preservation Society, a 501c3 not-for-profit organization. It is led by a Board of Directors who consist of local community leaders and theatre volunteers. The theatre also boasts a solid roster of hundreds of dedicated volunteers who work countless hours for events as ushers, ticket scanners, box office personnel, concessions workers, cleaners, and organ engineers.

The current professional staff consists of:

 David Fillenwarth - Executive Director
 Lindsay Pasquantino - Artist Relations & House Manager
 Christopher Mahiques - Controller & Human Resources
 Chuck Antolina - Technical Director
 Derek Heckler - Design Specialist (Marketing/Graphics/Lighting)
 Neal Brodfuehrer - Production Manager

Gallery

See also
Shea's Buffalo
North Park Theatre

References

External links

Official Website

Theatres in New York (state)
Concert halls in New York (state)
Theatres completed in 1926
Theatres on the National Register of Historic Places in New York (state)
Buildings and structures in Niagara County, New York
Tourist attractions in Niagara County, New York
North Tonawanda, New York
National Register of Historic Places in Niagara County, New York
Public venues with a theatre organ